Carl Columbus Hinkle, Jr. (March 3, 1917 – November 15, 1992) was an American college football player who was a stand-out center for the Vanderbilt Commodores football team.  He was elected to the College Football Hall of Fame in 1959.

References

External links

 

1917 births
1992 deaths
People from Hendersonville, Tennessee
American football centers
College Football Hall of Fame inductees
Players of American football from Tennessee
Vanderbilt Commodores football players
United States Army Air Forces personnel of World War II
United States Army Air Forces officers
United States Air Force colonels
United States Air Force personnel of the Korean War